Toby Dye is an English filmmaker based in London.He started his career as a documentary filmmaker and was awarded the prestigious Grierson Award in 2010 for his documentary film “Bodysnatchers of New York”. Along with this, other notable work includes music videos for Massive Attack and UNKLE, ‘Phobos’ for Ridley Scott and starring Michael Fassbender and Katherine Waterson, his internationally exhibited film/art installation ‘The Corridor’ and commercials for brands such as Heineken, Ford and American Express

Early life 
Dye grew up in the rural Peak District of Derbyshire, England. From age 16 he worked as a projectionist at his local art house cinema, which fuelled a passion in film. His career began in documentaries, principally working for the UK's Channel 4, on the TV series ‘True Stories’ and ‘Cutting Edge’, before he branched out into music videos and commercials after signing with Ridley Scott's production company, RSA Films.

Filmography

References 

Year of birth missing (living people)
Living people
English filmmakers